Cadwallader David Colden (April 4, 1769 – February 7, 1834) was an American politician who served as the 54th Mayor of New York City and a U.S. Representative from New York.

Early life
Colden was born at Spring Hill in Flushing, the family home, on April 4, 1769 in the Province of New York. He was the son of David Colden and Ann Alice (née Willett) Colden. He was the brother of Alice Christy Colden, Maria Colden, who married Josiah Ogden Hoffman, Elizabeth Colden, who married Edward Laight, and Catherine Colden, who married Thomas Cooper.

He was the grandson of Alice (née Chrystie) Colden and Cadwallader Colden (1688–1776), who served as the Governor of the Province of New York several times in the 1750s and 1770s.

He was taught by a private tutor, and then provided a classical education in Jamaica, New York and in London. After returning to the United States in 1785, he studied law, and was admitted to the bar in 1791.

Career
Colden first practiced law in New York City, then moved to Poughkeepsie, New York in 1793. He returned to New York in 1796 and from 1798 to 1801, he was Assistant Attorney General for the First District, comprising Suffolk, Queens, Kings, Richmond and Westchester counties. From 1810 to 1811, he was District Attorney of the First District, comprising the above-mentioned counties and New York County.

Colden was an active Freemason. He was the Senior Grand Warden of the Grand Lodge of New York in 1801-1805 and 1810–1819.<ref>Proceedings of the Grand Lodge of Free and Accepted Masons of the State of New York, May 1921, p. 254.</ref>

He became a Colonel of Volunteers in the War of 1812. Despite having owned slaves, in 1815 he became president of the New York Manumission Society, established in 1785 to promote the abolition of slavery in the state. He oversaw the rebuilding of the Society's African Free School in New York City. Later historians cited the energetic aid of Colden, Peter A. Jay, William Jay, Governor Daniel D. Tompkins, and others in influencing the New York legislature to set the date of July 4, 1827, for the abolition of slavery in the state.

Colden was also a member of the New York State Assembly in 1818, and the 54th Mayor of New York City from 1818 to 1821, appointed by Governor DeWitt Clinton. He successfully contested the election of Peter Sharpe to the 17th United States Congress and served from December 12, 1821, to March 3, 1823. He was a member of the New York State Senate (1st District) from 1825 to 1827, when he resigned.

After his resignation from the State Senate, he moved to Jersey City, New Jersey, where he devoted much of his time to the completion of the Morris Canal.

Literary accomplishments
A proponent of a national canal system, in 1825 Colden was commissioned by the Common Council of New York City, during the last days of the construction of the Erie Canal, to write his Memoir, Prepared at the Request of a Committee of the Common Council of the City of New York, and Presented to the Mayor of the City, at the Celebration of the Completion of the New York Canals''. The work and its Appendix contain period lithographs of the canal construction and highlights of the "Grand Canal Celebration" at New York City.

Personal life
On April 8, 1793, Colden was married to Maria Provoost (1770–1837), the daughter of Rt. Rev. Dr. Samuel Provoost, 1st Bishop of New York and Maria Bousefield Provoost. Together, they were the parents of:

 David Cadwallader Colden (1797–1850), who married Francis Wilkes (1796–1877), daughter of banker Charles Wilkes and sister of Rear Admiral Charles Wilkes.

Colden died in Jersey City, in 1834. His body was removed in 1843 from an interment in New Jersey to a receiving vault in Trinity Church Cemetery in upper Manhattan in New York City. He was removed in 1845 to a prominent spot in the cemetery's Easterly Division, overlooking the then rural intersection of the Bloomingdale Road (now Broadway) at West 153rd Street. By 1869, preparations to widen Broadway where the road cut through the cemetery caused Colden to be removed to another plot. His inconspicuous plot in the cemetery's Westerly Division was essentially forgotten until a local historian rediscovered it in July 2011.

References

External links

 
 Political Graveyard
 
 The White House, Where Aaron Burr arranged his memoirs, from Historic Houses of New Jersey by W. Jay Mills, 1902

1769 births
1834 deaths
19th-century American lawyers
19th-century American politicians
New York (state) state senators
Members of the New York State Assembly
People from Flushing, Queens
New York County District Attorneys
Queens County (New York) District Attorneys
American abolitionists
Federalist Party members of the United States House of Representatives from New York (state)
Burials at Trinity Church Cemetery
Activists from New York (state)
Members of the New York Manumission Society
People of the Province of New York
American Freemasons
People from New York (state) in the War of 1812
American slave owners
American colonels